Henry Chaddesden was a 14th-century English priest: he was Archdeacon of Leicester from 1347 until his death in 1354.

Notes

See also
 Diocese of Lincoln
 Diocese of Peterborough
 Diocese of Leicester
 Archdeacon of Leicester

Archdeacons of Leicester
14th-century English people
People from Derbyshire
1354 deaths